Year 964 (CMLXIV) was a leap year starting on Friday (link will display the full calendar) of the Julian calendar.

Events 
 Byzantine Empire 
 Arab–Byzantine War: Emperor Nikephoros II continues the reconquest of south-eastern Anatolia (modern Turkey). He recaptures Cyprus, and reorganizes the conquered lands into new themes. In the summer, they take the fortress cities of Anazarbus and Adana. Byzantine troops under General John Tzimiskes besiege Mopsuestia, but with the coming of winter he is forced to retreat to Caesarea. 
 October 24–25 – Siege of Rometta: Nikephoros II sends an expedition to Sicily. The Byzantine army (40,000 men) is sent to break the Muslim siege at Rometta, and to regain Sicily for the Byzantine Empire. For two days a battle takes place in the area between the beach and the besieged citadel of Rometta. The Saracens (under Al-Hasan ibn Ammar) manage to defeat the Byzantine relief force.

 Europe 
 Spring – King Adalbert II returns to the mainland of Italy, and occupies the environs of Spoleto. Emperor Otto I (the Great) leaves Rome with his army, and lays siege to the fortress city of Spoleto.
 Otto I proceeds on campaign in Italy, remaining in the environs of Lucca. In the fall he leaves plague-wracked Tuscany, and is forced to retreat to Liguria. His rearguard is attacked by Adalbert II.

 By topic 

 Religion 
 February – Pope John XII returns with his supporters to Rome. He convenes a synod that deposes Antipope Leo VIII who finds refuge at the court of Otto I. John dispatches a delegation under Otgar, bishop of Speyer, to negotiate an agreement. 
 May 14 – Pope John XII dies (rumoured to be by apoplexy, or at the hands of a cuckolded husband, during an illicit sexual liaison) after a 9-year reign. The Romans elect Benedict V, who is acclaimed by the city militia. He begins his pontificate as the 131st pope of the Catholic Church. 
 June 23 – Benedict V is deposed and ecclesiastically degraded after Otto I besieges Rome. He starves the Romans into submission and restores Leo VIII to the papal throne.

 Science 
 Abd al-Rahman al-Sufi, a Persian astronomer, writes the Book of Fixed Stars.

Births 
 Bertha of Burgundy, Frankish queen consort (d. 1010)
 Heonae, Korean queen consort and regent (d. 1029)
 Liu Wenzhi, official of the Song Dynasty (d. 1028)

Deaths 
 May 14 – John XII, pope of the Catholic Church
 July 3 – Henry I, Frankish nobleman and archbishop
 November 5 – Fan Zhi, chancellor of the Song Dynasty
 December 8 – Zhou (the Elder), Chinese queen consort
 Al-Hasan ibn Ali al-Kalbi, Fatimid nobleman and emir
 Fujiwara no Anshi, empress consort of Japan (b. 927)
 Godfrey I, count and vice-duke of Lower Lorraine
 Khosrov of Andzev, Armenian monk and poet
 Toichleach ua Gadhra, king of Gailenga (Ireland)

References